Changes in Latitudes, Changes in Attitudes is the seventh studio album by American popular music singer-songwriter Jimmy Buffett. This is his breakthrough 1977 album, which remains the best-selling studio album of Buffett's career, and contains his biggest single, "Margaritaville".  It was initially released in January 1977 as ABC AB-990 and later rereleased on its successor label, MCA.

Changes was very popular and critically well-received and was a transitional album on several levels for Buffett.  In a commercial sense, it ushered in Buffett's greatest period of chart and airplay popularity – changing him from an FM cult favorite and minor hitmaker to a top-draw touring artist whose albums sold in the millions, receiving regular AM airplay at the time.  Changes would be followed by equally popular and more grandiose expressions of Buffett's "Caribbean Soul" on Son of a Son of a Sailor (1978) and Volcano (1979).  All of these albums would combine pop, bar-band rock, country, folk, and reggae influences with the professional production of Norbert Putnam.

Changes also represented the beginning of the end of the "Key West Albums": the Don Gant-produced A White Sport Coat and a Pink Crustacean (1973), Living & Dying in 3/4 Time (1974), A1A (1974), and Havaña Daydreamin' (1976).  These four albums capture the feel of the early 1970s Key West, Florida and Buffett's experiences as a struggling musician and storyteller.  Although the albums are not exclusively about Key West, they detail the laid back island ethos of the small island city and its pre-"condo commando" status as an American Casablanca ... a place where no one knows your name and would not care if they did.  At the time, Key West was a derelict navy town looking for a direction and was filled with small bars and restaurants craving troubadours like Buffett, Steve Goodman, Jerry Jeff Walker, and others who would play for bar money.  The albums document life in the Gulf of Mexico Region ("Biloxi", "Banana Republics", "Woman Goin' Crazy on Caroline Street", "Wonder Why We Ever Go Home") with displays of touring craziness ("Miss You So Badly").  After Changes, Buffett's scope grew to include the entire Caribbean and, later, the vast expanse of what would become "world music."  Buffett's Key West experiences would pepper his later work (even recording his albums in Key West's Shrimpboat Sound), but not like it did in the 1973–1977 period.  It is this period, along with his 1978 and 1979 albums, that created the mythos Jimmy Buffett has parlayed into icon status as a performer, restaurateur, entrepreneur, author, and celebrity.

Chart performance
Changes in Latitudes, Changes in Attitudes reached No. 12 on the Billboard 200 album chart and No. 2 on the Billboard Top Country Albums chart.  The album was also certified "Platinum" by the RIAA.

Two singles from the album charted including "Margaritaville" (#8 on the Billboard Hot 100; No. 13 on the Billboard Hot Country Singles chart; No. 1 on the Billboard Easy Listening chart) and "Changes in Latitudes, Changes in Attitudes" (#37 Hot 100; No. 24 Country; No. 11 Easy Listening).

Songs
The songs on the album were written or co-written by Buffett except for three covers: Steve Goodman's "Banana Republics", Jonathan Baham’s “Lovely Cruise” and Jesse Winchester's "Biloxi."

Two of the songs on the album had also previously been recorded by Buffett.  The original version of "Wonder Why We Ever Go Home" appeared on the  Rancho Deluxe soundtrack under the title "Wonder Why You Ever Go Home" and a different version of "In The Shelter" was originally released in 1971 on High Cumberland Jubilee. "In the Shelter" was re-recorded for the album Changes In Latitudes, Changes In Attitudes in 1977. But then re-recorded yet again for the compilation album in 2002's Meet Me in Margaritaville: The Ultimate Collection making it (with "The Captain and the Kid") one of only two Buffett songs with three different studio versions.

Aside from "Biloxi", all songs appear at least once on a live album, making Changes in Latitudes, Changes in Attitudes the LP with the most live appearances.

The title track begins with an instrumental introduction which initially resembles "Yellow Bird" (originally a 19th-century Haitian song, which gained popularity in the U.S. through a Hawaiian-flavored instrumental by the Arthur Lyman group in 1961), and then it gradually evolves into the distinctive chorus of the song itself. In the song, the line "good times and riches and son-of-a-bitches, I've seen more than I can recall" was replaced with "good time and riches, some bruises and stitches, I've seen more than I can recall" for the radio edit single release of the title-track, with rather crude (and obvious) editing, although American Top 40 did play the original unedited version only once when it debuted at No. 38 on 10/22/77.

Track listing

Personnel
Credits from album liner notes. 

The Coral Reefer Band:
Jimmy Buffett – lead and backing vocals, acoustic guitar
Greg "Fingers" Taylor – harmonica and “one line” of vocals on "Lovely Cruise"
Michael Utley – organ, piano
Harry Dailey – backing vocals, bass
 Michael Gardner – drums (except “Landfall,” “Biloxi,” and “Margaritaville”)
Kenneth "Barfullo" Buttrey – congas; drums on "Landfall", "Biloxi," and "Margaritaville"
Michael Jeffry – backing vocals, lead guitar
Roger Bartlett – lead guitar on "In the Shelter"
Farrell Morris – percussion
Billy Puett – recorders and flutes on "Margaritaville"
David Bryant – backing vocals
Norbert Putnam – producer; string arrangements on "Changes in Latitudes, Changes in Attitudes" and "Biloxi" 
Norbert Putnam, Michael Utley – string arrangements on "Tampico Trauma" and "Banana Republics"
Michael Utley – flutes and recorders arrangements on "Margaritaville", composed poolside in Miami
Shelly Kurland – concertmaster

Singles
"Margaritaville" b/w "Miss You So Badly" (Released on ABC Dunhill 12254 on February 14, 1977)
"Changes in Latitudes, Changes in Attitudes" b/w "Landfall" (Released on ABC Dunhill 12305 in August 1977)

Tour
1977 saw Jimmy catch a big wave as he opened for The Eagles for several dates in March and a few in July. "Margaritaville" flew up the charts in the summer, helping the summer tour grow to the amphitheaters that Jimmy still plays today. Amazing Rhythm Aces opened for a few shows in California in May, while the Little River Band was picked up in June to open. Jennifer Warnes also opened some shows. In late June, Jimmy added new drummer Kenneth Buttrey to the band and they rehearsed for three nights in Sarasota, FL before embarking on a tour of the south that included a couple of shows opening for The Eagles again in Florida and Texas. The August 2 show in New York was broadcast along the east coast on the Radio, Jimmy's first broadcast since 1975. A special show was played in September as Jimmy opened for Fleetwood Mac at County Stadium in Milwaukee, WI. For the fall, Jimmy drafted Jesse Winchester to open shows throughout the south and along the east coast.

1977 Coral Reefer Band
Jimmy Buffett: Vocals and guitar
Tim Krekel: Guitar and Background Vocals
Harry Dailey: Bass and Background Vocals
Jay Spell: Piano
Greg "Fingers" Taylor: Harmonica and Background Vocals
Michael Utley: Keyboards
Kenneth Buttrey: Drums

Set list
Setlists changed nightly, mainly during an acoustic set that took place between "Makin' Music for Money" and "Margaritaville", but the structure was pretty consistent.  The shows typically opened with the title track and ended with "Tampico Trauma".  "This Hotel Room" (Steve Goodman cover) and "Dixie Diner" (Larry Raspberry and the Highsteppers cover) were played during the encore, with the band occasionally coming back out on stage after "Dixie Diner" to perform "Lovely Cruise" as a second encore.

An average set list:
"Changes in Latitudes, Changes in Attitudes"
"Pencil Thin Mustache"
"Wonder Why We Ever Go Home"
"Landfall"
"Banana Republics" (Steve Goodman cover)
"Makin' Music for Money"
"God's Own Drunk" (Richard Buckley cover) (acoustic)
"Margaritaville"
"A Pirate Looks at Forty"
"Come Monday"
"Why Don't We Get Drunk"
"Biloxi" (Jesse Winchester cover)
"Tampico Trauma" Encore:
"This Hotel Room" (Steve Goodman cover)
"Dixie Diner" (Larry Raspberry And The Highsteppers cover) Encore 2:
"Lovely Cruise"

References

Jimmy Buffett albums
1977 albums
Albums produced by Norbert Putnam
ABC Records albums